Shorr is an Indian television drama series that aired on Sahara One. The series follow the story of speech-impaired girl named Kanku. The series premiered on 14 June 2010 and is produced by Jay Mehta.

Cast

 Snigdha Srivastava as Kanku 
 Yasir Shah as Munjal Mahendra Sanghani
 Roopa Divetia as Pankor Sanghani (Pan Ba)
 Tej Pawa] as Dilip 
 Rachayita Agrawal as Harsha
 Trishna Vivek as Kaveri 
 Neetha Shetty as Aatma
 Aman Verma as Sarang
 Megha Joshi as Vidya Mukund Sanghani
 Sunny Pancholi as Mukund Mahendra Sanghani 
 Kishori Shahane as Rudrani Devi
 Sonia Shah as Charubala Mahendra Sanghani, Munjal's Mother
 Mehul buch as Mahendra pankor Sanghani, Munjal's Father
 Adarsh Gautam as Mahendra's brother
 unknown person as Bhulibaai
 unknown person as Radhika

References

External links
Shorr Official Site on Sahara One

Sahara One original programming
Indian drama television series
2010 Indian television series debuts
2011 Indian television series endings